Dương Văn Pho (born 17 March 1984) is a Vietnamese footballer who plays as a defender for V-League club Đồng Nai.

References 

1984 births
Living people
Vietnamese footballers
Association football defenders
V.League 1 players
Hoang Anh Gia Lai FC players
Dong Nai FC players
Dong Thap FC players